Tanaecium is a genus of flowering plants in the family Bignoniaceae, native to south and Central America.

Species
Tanaecium affinis (A.H Gentry) L.G. Lohmann
Tanaceium apiculatum A.H Gentry
Tanaecium bilabiatum (Sprague) L.G. Lohmann
Tanaceium caudiculatum (Standl) L.G. Lohmann
Tanaceium crucigerum Seem.
Tanaceium cyrtanthum (Mart. ex DC.) Bureau & K.Schum.
Tanaecium duckei A. Samp.
Tanaecium exitiosum Dugand
Tanaecium jaroba Sw.
Tanaecium neobrasiliensis Baill. L.G. Lohmann
Tanaecium pyramidatum (Rich.) L.G. Lohmann
Tanaecium revillae (A.H. Gentry) L.G. Lohmann
Tanaecium selloi (Spreng.) L.G. Lohmann
Tanaecium tetragonolobum (Jacq.) L.G. Lohmann
Tanaecium truncatum (A. Samp.) L.G. Lohmann
Tanaecium xanthophyllum (DC.) L.G. Lohmann

References

Bignoniaceae
Bignoniaceae genera
Taxa named by Olof Swartz